Napoleón Baccino Ponce de León (born Montevideo, 1947) is an Uruguayan writer. He is best known for his historical novel Maluco. La Novela de Los Descubridores, a fictional account of Magellan's circumnavigation of the world. The book won the Premio Casa de las Américas in 1989. It was later translated into English by Nick Caistor and into French by Nelly Lhermillier.

References

Uruguayan novelists
Male novelists
20th-century novelists
21st-century novelists
Writers from Montevideo
1947 births
Living people
20th-century Uruguayan male writers
21st-century male writers
Fraternity Award